Sukkal (conventionally translated from Sumerian as "vizier") was a term which could denote both a type of official and a class of deities in ancient Mesopotamia. The historical sukkals were responsible for overseeing the execution of various commands of the kings and acted as diplomatic envoys and translators for foreign dignitaties. The deities referred to as sukkals fulfilled a similar role in mythology, acting as servants, advisors and envoys of the main gods of the Mesopotamian pantheon, such as Enlil or Inanna. The best known sukkal is the goddess Ninshubur. In art, they were depicted carrying staffs, most likely understood as their attribute. They could function as intercessory deities, believed to mediate between worshipers and the major gods.

The office sukkal is also known from various areas to the west and east of Mesopotamia, including the Hurrian kingdom Arrapha, Syrian Alalakh and Mari and Elam under the rule of the Sukkalmah Dynasty, while the concept of divine sukkals was incorporated into Hurrian religion, in which major gods such as Kumarbi or Hebat commonly appear in company of their sukkals, similar to their Mesopotamian counterparts.

The office of sukkal
The word sukkal (Akkadian: sukkallu)  has Sumerian origin and at first denoted a class of human officials, responsible for the implementation of the commands of the king. Translations found in literature include "vizier," "secretary," and "chancellor." Tonia Sharlach notes that "vizier" is considered to be the standard translation today. The same word is also conventionally employed as a translation of the name of another, unrelated, office,  badalum, used in northern Syrian cities, such as Harran and Abarsal, in the third millennium BCE. It is also the conventional term for the head of the Eblaite administration, most likely referred to as lugal sa-za. The word sukkal is attested in Eblaite documents, but seemingly designates a type of clergyman instead.

This office of sukkal is also known from outside southern Mesopotamia, for example from Mari from Alalakh in western Syria, from the Hurrian kingdom of Arrapha in northeastern Mesopotamia, and from Elam. At least in southern Mesopotamia and Mari, a sukkal served as an intermediary between the royal administration and foreign envoys. There is evidence that they often knew more than one language and acted as translators, and some were likely foreigners or children of foreigners who settled in Mesopotamia. In some cases, a specific foreign dignitary was always mentioned alongside the same local sukkal accompanying him.

A related office, known from Early Dynastic Girsu and from the administrative texts of the Third Dynasty of Ur, was that of the sukkalmah (GAL.SUKKAL, sukkalmaḫḫu). Tonia Sharlach proposes this term should be understood as the equivalent of a modern secretary of state. A sukkalmah was in charge of a number of sukkals. In Elam, this term was adopted as a royal title, possibly because the sukkalmahs of the Ur III state, who resides in Lagash, close to Elamite territory, were in charge of the territories surrounding Susa when the state they served reached its maximal extent. The so-called Sukkalmah Dynasty ruled over Elam in the early second millennium BCE.

Some lexical texts explain sukkal as pašišu, "salve priest," though the reason behind the equation of these two terms is not known.

Sukkal as a type of deities
In Mesopotamian religion, some deities were designated as sukkals, and founctioned as a divine counterpart of the human officials. Due to more direct evidence present in myths compared to economic and administrative texts, their functions are better known than these of their human namesakes. A sukkal was the highest ranked member of a deity's court, and in some cases in god lists could appear even before their children. At the same time, not every servant deity was a sukkal. Three distinct classes of divine servants can be found in various documents: advisers and representatives (including the sukkal), deities dealing with the personal needs of a god, and finally those tasked with upkeep of their household, such as divine cooks or gardeners. In myths, sukkals act both as traveling envoys of their masters, and as their advisors at home. Wisdom was frequently regarded as a trait of this class of deities. While most deities had courtiers, usually only these whose position in the pantheon was well established had sukkals, and sukkals of the major city gods were likely the oldest deities of this type. Instances of a sukkal having a sukkal of their own, while known, should be regarded as an anomaly according to Richard L. Litke. For example, Niĝgina, a sukkal of the sun god Utu, had her own sukkal, as did Alammuš, the sukkal of the moon god Nanna.

The goddess Ninshubur is regarded by Assyriologists as "the earliest and most important" sukkal, the "archetypal vizier of the gods."

The attribute associated with all sukkals was a staff. Papsukkal could be called bēl ḫaṭṭi, "lord of the staff." Similarly, Nuska bore the Sumerian epithet en-ĝidri, "lord of the scepter." Alla, Isimud and Ninshubur were depicted holding staffs too. One possible depiction of Ninshubur carrying a staff is present on the seal of Lugal-ushumgal, governor of Lagash during the reigns of Naram-Sin of Akkad and his son Shar-Kali-Sharri. A sukkal was expected to walk in front of their master, leading the way with their staff. Sukkals could be associated with doors as well. In literary texts, they could be tasked with screening visitors who wanted to see their master.

The title of sukkalmaḫ could be applied to divine sukkals, though there is no evidence that a divine sukkalmaḫ was in charge of regular sukkals, and in some cases a deity had multiple sukkals but none of them was referred as a sukkalmaḫ, while in other a sukkalmaḫ was the only sukkal of their master. Most likely addressing a deity as a sukkalmaḫ was only meant to highlight the high position of their master in the pantheon. Deities addressed as sukkalmaḫs include Nuska (the sukkal of Enlil), Ara (one of the two sukkals of Enki), Ninpirig (one of the sukkals of Utu), Ninshubur (the sukkal of Inanna) and Alammuš (the sukkal of Nanna). A further title used to describe some of the divine sukkals was SAL.ḪÚB2. In most of the texts where this word is attested, it occurs in parallel with "sukkal." It only ever designates gods, not human officials, and only a handful of attestations are known. It is assumed that it referred to a sukkal particularly emotionally close to their master. Deities referred to this way include Ninshubur (both male and female), Bunene, Ninpirig, Nabu and Muduggasa'a (in a bilingual text where he occurs as the equivalent of the former), and Innimanizi. The number of references to each of them is not equal, and only Ninshubur is referred to as SAL.ḪÚB2 more than once or twice, with seven recorded instances currently known. In one case, she was labeled as the "beloved SAL.ḪÚB2 of Inanna," and appears right after Dumuzi in an enumeration of deities associated with her mistress, before some of her family members, for example her sister in law Geshtinanna. In some cases, terms such as MUNUS.SUKKAL (for example in the case of Sililitum) or nin-sukkal (in the case of Ninshubur and Amasagnudi) was used to indicate a sukkal was female.

It has been argued that many sukkals simply represented the effect of their masters' actions: the fire god Gibil was served by a deified flame, Nabium, while the weather god Ishkur by a deified lightning, Nimgir. Other seem to be personifications of specific commands, for example Eturammi ("do not slacken"), Nēr-ē-tagmil ("kill, spare not") or Ugur ("destroy"). However, Frans Wiggermann points out that neither explanation is suitable for the sukkals of particularly well established deities: Ninshubur, Nuska, Bunene, Isimud and Alammuš, whose character was independent from that of their masters.

It is sometimes argued that a sukkal had to match the gender for their master. However, Namtar, Ereshkigal's sukkal, was male. The sukkal of the medicine goddess Gula, Urmašum, was a male deity too. Amasagnudi, regarded as a goddess, appears as the sukkal of Anu in a single lexical text.

Sukkals could act as intercessory deities, leading to comparisons between them and another class of minor deities, lamma, in modern scholarship. Both of them could be depicted in similar scenes on cylinder seals, leading a human visitor to their divine master. The goddess Lammašaga was identified both as a sukkal and a lamma.  A third class of deities involved in intercession were wives of major gods, and on occasion comparisons are made between them and sukkals too, for example the role of a mediator between a major deity and worshipers played by Ninshubur in the cult of Inanna has been compared to that played by the spouses of other major gods, Aya in the cult of Shamash or Shala in Adad's.

Sukkals have also been compared to angels in comparative scholarship, and some researchers, for example Jan van Dijk and Frans Wiggermann, tentatively label study of sukkals as "Sumerian angelology." Similarly, it has been argued that the nature of Lamma deities can be compared to modern idea of guardian angels.

List of sukkals

In addition to the sukkals listed above, according to the god list An = Anum the following deities had sukkals whose names are either not preserved or only partially preserved in known copies: Dingirmah, a goddess from Adab conflated with Ninhursag, Gishhuranki, the wife of Ashgi, Šulpae, Panigingarra, and Ninsun. An offering list from Umma from the Ur III period mentions a nameless sukkal of the artisan goddess Ninmug. Frans Wiggermann argues that based on iconographic evidence it can be assumed that sukkals associated with Nanshe and Ningirsu also existed, though their names are unknown.

List of sukkals from outside Mesopotamia
The concept of sukkal was also incorporated into Hurrian religion. The Hurrian spelling of this word was šukkalli. All of the major Hurrian gods were believed to have their own sukkals.

See also 
 Angels in Judaism
 Uthra (in Mandaeism)

References

Bibliography

 

Sumerian titles
Mesopotamian mythology
Hurrian mythology
Messenger deities